R&B Divas is a compilation album led by American singer Faith Evans. The album was released  Prolific Music and E1 Music on October 2, 2012 and features previously unreleased content from Evans and fellow female R&B singers Nicci Gilbert, Monifah, Syleena Johnson, and KeKe Wyatt, the first season stars of the same-titled TV One reality series, as well as contribution from Kelly Price and Fantasia. While the compilation is credited as an Evans album, she is performing only on seven of the twelve tracks on R&B Divas, though she compiled and executive produced the album.

Upon release, R&B Divas earned generally mixed reviews from critics who found it well-sung and well-produced but scattered. It however, earned a Grammy nomination for Best R&B Album at the 55th Grammy Awards ceremony. It debuted at number 46 on the US Billboard 200 with first week sales of 10,817 units, also reaching the top ten on both the US R&B/Hip-Hop Albums and the Independent Albums. R&B Divas was preceded by two singles, "Tears of Joy" and "Dumb," both led by Evans, the former of which reached the top five of the US Adult R&B Songs.

Critical reception 

Upon release, R&B Divas earned generally mixed reviews by critics. Mark Edward Nero, writer for About.com, felt that "despite its minor flaws, R&B Divas is a well-sung, well-produced compilation proving that although the ladies featured on the album may not have the music industry in the palms of their hands as they did back at the heights of their careers 10 to 15 years ago, they're still creative, talented artists who still have much to offer as far as good music." Andy Kellman from Allmusic wrote that "the show entailed the making of an album to benefit the Whitney E. Houston Academy. This is that album, a compilation featuring all the singers together and apart with a large cast of songwriters and producers. The results, perhaps unsurprisingly, are scattered [...] Five songs, highlighted by "Too High for Love," are basically Evans solo showcases that aren't too distanced stylistically from her 2010 album."

Chart performance
R&B Divas debuted at number 46 on the US Billboard 200 with first week sales of 10,817 units. It also entered the top ten on both the US R&B/Hip-Hop Albums and the Independent Albums, peaking at number six and eight, respectively.

Track listing

Charts

Release history

References

External links
 

2012 albums
Faith Evans albums
Albums produced by 1500 or Nothin'